Heinrich Anacker (29 January 1901 – 14 January 1971) was a Swiss-German author.

Anacker was born in Buchs, Aargau. He entered National Socialist circles in Vienna in 1922, joined the SA, and after 1933 lived in Berlin as a freelance writer.  He wrote a spate of SA and Hitler Youth songs and was considered the "lyricist of the Brown Front"; he won the 1934 Dietrich Eckart Prize and the 1936 NSDAP Prize for Art.  Nonetheless, after the war he was classified as only minimally incriminated.  His poetry collections include Die Trommel (The Drum; 1931), Der Aufbau (Uplift; 1936), and Glück auf, es geht gen Morgen (Hurrah, It Will Soon Be Morning; 1943).

Brothers, what will remain from our time?
Runes will forever glow!
Our bodies will disappear
As dust in the winds they will blow.

It was we who built the streets,
That our grandchildren first saw complete;
Along them, cars will boldly whiz,
For a hundred and a thousand years.
What we wrote in inflexible deeds
Unshaken will ever remain,
Forever, beginning and amen,
The most vivid rune: The Führer's name!

— "Brothers, What Will Remain?" in Das Schwarze Korps, 14 August 1935.

He died in Wasserburg am Bodensee, aged 69.

Bibliography
Christian Zentner, Friedemann Bedürftig (1991). The Encyclopedia of the Third Reich.  Macmillan, New York. 

1901 births
1971 deaths
People from Aarau
Nazi Party members
Sturmabteilung personnel
Swiss Nazis
German male writers
Swiss emigrants to Germany